Jamie Cording (born 30 December 1989) is a rugby league footballer who last played for Featherstone Rovers in the Kingstone Press Championship.

He previously played for the Huddersfield in the Super League and the Featherstone Rovers, the Sheffield Eagles and Gateshead Thunder in the lower leagues.

In September 2013, Cording signed a two-year contract with the Featherstone Rovers.

References

External links
(archived by web.archive.org) Castleford Tigers profile

1989 births
Living people
English rugby league players
Featherstone Rovers players
Huddersfield Giants players
Newcastle Thunder players
Rugby league second-rows
Sheffield Eagles players